Yellow (stylized YELLOW) is the fourth extended play (EP) by South Korean singer and songwriter Kang Daniel. It was released on April 13, 2021 by Konnect Entertainment and distributed by Sony Music Korea. Yellow contains five tracks with "Antidote" as its lead single.

"Paranoia" was pre-released on February 16. This album is the final installment in Kang's trilogy project aimed to find his colors as a solo artist. Cyan had a youthful pop vibe, whereas Magenta was dance-based and powerful. Yellow represents the different stages Kang went through during a darker period in his life when he lost but eventually found hope.

Background and composition
On February 2, 2021, Konnect Entertainment posted a surprise comeback teaser video for what would be Kang Daniel's digital single prerelease "Paranoia", set for February 16. Kang, who penned the lyrics himself, drew inspiration from when he went on hiatus due to mental and physical health issues and expressed the pain and anguish he had experienced. The song combines synth bells, 808 bass, and electric guitar.

On March 18, Kang confirmed a follow-up comeback scheduled for April 13 with the release of his new album Yellow, promising tracks full of meaningful messages. The album's title track "Antidote" connects to the main story in "Paranoia" and is an alternative R&B song with rock elements. Kang is credited as the main lyricist in all of the album's songs. In contrast to the bright, positive image conventionally associated with the color yellow, Kang Daniel's yellow color represents warning, danger, and imperfect signals between green and red lights. Following the album's release, Kang explained the underlying story connecting the song tracks. Yellow captures the time when Kang was at his lowest point due to deteriorating health exacerbated by cyberbullying and chronicles his journey to recovery.

Revealing his reason for selecting a diamond as the cover art and the album cover's symbolism, Kang said "Depending on how much pressure is put on it, it becomes a diamond or stays a lump of coal. It's about the pressures put on me and where I am right now because of those pressures."

Promotion
Kang and his manager appeared on the February 13 episode of Omniscient Interfering View and showed the making-of the "Paranoia" music video. On February 16, Kang held an online press conference to commemorate the single's release. He opened up further about his hiatus and retold other stories on Radio Star. Kang also appeared on Law of the Jungle and  I Can See Your Voice with Baek Ji-young.
Prior to the album's release, Kang appeared on the hundredth episode of MBC's Where Is My Home as the show's founding contributor and Problem Child in House to introduce his upcoming music. On April 13, Kang kicked off Yellow promotions with a press conference prior to the release and an online fan showcase. Ten days later, he appeared on KBS2's Come Back Home TV and I Live Alone. Kang was also invited as the first guerrilla date guest on the rebooted Entertainment Weekly where he met fans, including Hyun Jung-hwa.

Commercial performance
The digital single "Paranoia" received two Gaon crowns and won four music show trophies with its music video exceeding 10 million views in two days and 20 million views in four days. It also marked Kang's first solo appearance on Billboard'''s World Digital Song Sales chart with the single debuting at number five.

Following the release of Yellow, Kang earned his first Gaon quadruple crown by topping the digital, album, download, and BGM weekly charts. Lead single "Antidote" was a commercial success in South Korea, debuting at number one on the Gaon Digital Chart for the chart issue dated April 11–17, 2021, becoming Kang's first domestic number one single. The song won a total of five music show trophies including his first Inkigayo win since debuting as a solo artist. The music video for "Antidote" exceeded 10 million views in 12 hours, besting Kang's previous record and later becoming his first solo music video to exceed 30 million views, doing so in four days. Yellow earned a Hanteo sales certificate, making it Kang's fourth album to place in Hanteo's top 10 solo artist first-week sales as of June 2021.

Critical reception
Kang has garnered the most international media attention since debuting as a solo artist with the release of Yellow for his evolving musicality. In an article collecting Genius Korea's favorite albums of 2021, Yellow was described as being "mesmerizing without being enigmatic; its somber mood allows us to focus on the messages Kang succeeds to convey, without any word being lost in translation". Writing for Rolling Stone India, Riddhi Chakraborty highlighted the fact that Kang presented a stronger side of himself as a songwriter with writing credits — all of which were drawn from personal experience — on every track of Yellow. The EP was included in a list titled "Best K-pop Albums of 2021 so far" by South China Morning Post'' where Tamar Herman said Kang "reached new heights" with its release.

Track listing

Charts

Weekly charts

Monthly charts

Year-end charts

Certifications and sales

Accolades

Release history

See also
List of certified albums in South Korea
List of Gaon Album Chart number ones of 2021

Notes

References

Kang Daniel albums
2021 EPs
Korean-language EPs
Sony Music EPs
Konnect Entertainment EPs